Prayer of the Rollerboys is a 1990 independent science fiction film directed by Rick King and starring Corey Haim and Patricia Arquette.

Plot summary
Griffin, an accomplished inline skater, works as a delivery boy in near-future Los Angeles. The city is overrun with crime and drug use, in the wake of "The Great Crash": an economic catastrophe triggered by the greed of previous generations. The film includes ominous events, including: news reports of riots in Washington D.C. (due to the Armed Forces going on strike); a television ad announcing that Harvard University was moved to Japan, followed by a question from one of the characters if "there will be any Universities left in America"; a newspaper headline that proclaims "GERMANY BUYS POLAND"; and references to the Vatican hiring the Israeli Defense Forces to "clean up" Northern Ireland.

A heavily-armed white supremacist conglomerate known as the Rollerboys fight for control of the decaying city. Their director is charismatic narcotics-kingpin Gary Lee: a childhood neighbor of Griffin's, who's also rumored to be the great-grandson of Adolf Hitler. The Rollerboys carry out their mission of restoring Anglo-America's former greatness, through violent battles with other gangs...and through the distribution of "Heaven Mist", a designer drug. Griffin's younger brother Miltie, who idolizes the Rollerboys, takes a job with them pushing mist on the streets; eventually, Miltie starts using it himself. Then Casey, an undercover cop, recruits Griffin to join the Rollerboys as a mole...in exchange for a better life.

Griffin is initiated but his loyalty to the Rollerboys is soon called into question. In order to prove himself, he unknowingly pummels Speedbagger, his and Miltie's Afro-American landlord, nearly to death. Shortly thereafter, Griffin discovers the chilling truth behind the Rollerboys' mantra "The Day of the Rope is coming". Rope turns out to be a toxic mist-additive, developed by the Rollerboys, which gradually renders its users sterile; the purpose of this is to "eliminate the weak", removing future generations of the "junkie" population, thus giving the Rollerboys free rein over their concepts of a thriving American society.

Cast 
 Corey Haim as Griffin
 Patricia Arquette as Detective Casey
 Christopher Collet as Gary Lee
 Julius Harris as "Speedbagger"
 Devin Clark as Miltie
 Mark Pellegrino as Bango
 Morgan Weisser as Bullwinkle
 J.C. Quinn as Lieutenant Jaworski
 Aron Eisenberg as Teen Boy
 Jake Dengel as Tyler
 G. Smokey Campbell as Watt
 John P. Connolly as "Pinky"
 Dal Trader as Sergeant
 John-Michael Steele as Officer Rogers (uncredited)

Reception
The film was nominated for two Saturn Awards: Best Performance by a Younger Actor (Corey Haim) and Best Science Fiction Film.
Movie historian Leonard Maltin gave the film 2.5 out of a possible 4 stars: "...A provocative setting and some clever bits of dark comedy are weakened by needlessly-excessive violence...Christopher Collet (as usual) projects enough magnetism for ten, but not even he can counteract a painfully-predictable finale."

See also
Ethnic bioweapon

References

External links
 
 
 http://www.paper-dragon.com/cyberpunk/rns/rollerboys/ (includes role-playing game stats)

1991 films
1991 independent films
1990s science fiction action films
American science fiction action films
Films set in Los Angeles
Films shot in Los Angeles
American independent films
American teen films
Roller skating films
1990s teen films
1990s English-language films
Films directed by Rick King
1990s American films